The Chile women's national  under-20 football team represents Chile in the international women's football at under-20 age levels competitions. It is administered by the Federación de Fútbol de Chile (FFC) and is a member of CONMEBOL.The team plays South American Under-20 Women's Football Championship.

History
The Chile women's national under-20 football team represents Chile at women's soccer age of U-20. They have faced Bolivia on 11 May 2004 at Sucre, Bolivia and which lost by 1–9 goals its their biggest defeat as so far. In their South American Under-20 Women's Football Championship competition history the girls finished Fourth-Place in 2010. The teams have not yet qualified to FIFA U-20 Women's World Cup.

Current squad
The following squad was named for 2022 South American Under-20 Women's Football Championship

Fixtures and results
Legend

2022

Competitive records

FIFA U-20 Women's World Cup

South American Under-20 Women's Football Championship

References

 
South American women's national association football teams
South American U-20 Women's Championship